The Australia national represent Australia in international American football (gridiron) competitions. The team is organised by Gridiron Australia, the national governing body for the sport.

IFAF World Championship record

The 2019 IFAF World Championship was to be held in Australia. Initially it was postponed to 2023 and then moved to Germany, before being postponed again to 2025.

History
Organised gridiron football in Australia dates back to 1983. In 1996, its national governing body, Gridiron Australia, was formed. Australia was a charter member of the International Federation of American Football (IFAF), and competed in the inaugural 1999 IFAF World Cup. They have since competed in the Oceania Bowl in 2005 and the Samoa Bowl in 2011, among other international competitions. Australia has competed in the IFAF World Championship since 2011.

References

External links

 https://www.gridiron.org.au/

 
American football in Australia
Men's national American football teams
Men's national sports teams of Australia
1996 establishments in Australia
American football teams established in 1996